Refuge du Folly is a refuge in the Alps, located in Haute-Savoie department, in France. Its capacity is 72 persons. It has both private rooms and dorms.

References

Mountain huts in the Alps
Mountain huts in France